Caecilia pressula is a species of caecilian in the family Caeciliidae. It is found in Guyana and possibly Brazil. Its natural habitats are subtropical or tropical moist lowland forests.

References

pressula
Amphibians described in 1968
Taxonomy articles created by Polbot